Trans World Radio (TWR) is a multinational evangelical Christian media distributor. The largest Christian media organization in the world, it uses mediumwave or high-powered AM and shortwave transmitters, local FM radio stations, cable, satellite, Internet, and mobile device technologies. Currently, their programs can be heard in 190 countries in more than 300 languages and dialects.

TWR distributes programs for ministries such as Thru the Bible and Turning Point as well as their own programs.

TWR is a member of Evangelical Council for Financial Accountability (ECFA), Evangelical Press Association (EPA), National Religious Broadcasters (NRB), and International Orality Network (ION).

History

TWR started in 1952, when  set up the organization to reach Spain by broadcasting from Morocco. Later, TWR moved to Monaco. Other major transmitting sites include Guam (KTWG), Bonaire, Sri Lanka, Cyprus, and eSwatini (Swaziland). The Federal Communications Commission has assigned the call letters KTWR to the Guam transmitter site. The callsign PJB is assigned to the Bonaire station.

References

Further reading
 Freed, Paul E. (1979). Towers to Eternity, Nashville, Sceptre Books.

External links

Evangelical medias
International radio networks
Christian radio stations in the United States
Shortwave radio stations in the United States
Russian-language radio stations
French-language radio stations
German-language radio stations
International broadcasters
Christianity in Guam
American companies established in 1952
Cary, North Carolina